Lisa Morton (born December 11, 1958) is an American horror author and screenwriter.

Biography 

Morton was born in Pasadena, California, and entered the film industry in 1979 as a modelmaker on Star Trek: The Motion Picture. In 1988 she co-wrote (with make-up effects expert Tom Burman) Life On the Edge, which was later re-titled Meet the Hollowheads; she also served as an Associate Producer on the film, and received an acting credit as "the Edge Slut" (in a scene that was cut from the film). The film was shown at the Odeon London Film Festival, was selected to appear in London’s Shock Around the Clock Film Festival for 1989 and was one of 12 films selected to appear in the Avoriaz Film Festival.

Morton also co-wrote the films Adventures in Dinosaur City, Tornado Warning, and Blood Angels. As an animation writer, she wrote for the series Sky Dancers and Dragon Flyz.

In the 1990s, Morton began publishing short horror fiction. In 2006, her short story "Tested" (from Cemetery Dance magazine) won the Bram Stoker Award for Best Short Fiction. In 2009, she edited the anthology Midnight Walk, and her first novella, The Lucid Dreaming, was published by Bad Moon Books and went on to win the Bram Stoker Award for Best Long Fiction.

Her second novella, The Samhanach, was nominated for the Bram Stoker Award for Best Long Fiction, and was named the top pick in the 2011 reviewer poll by Monster Librarian.

Her first novel, The Castle of Los Angeles, was published in 2010 by Gray Friar Press. It won the Bram Stoker Award for Best First Novel (tie) and was nominated for “Best Small Press Chill” by the 4th Annual Dark Scribe Awards.

Her 2013 novel Malediction was nominated for the Bram Stoker Award for Best Novel.

Morton has also worked as an editor. Her anthology Midnight Walk (2009) received a nomination for the Bram Stoker Award for Best Anthology and won the Black Quill Award for Best Dark Genre Anthology. Her 2017 Halloween-themed anthology Haunted Nights (co-edited with Ellen Datlow) received a starred review from Publishers Weekly.

Her 2019 anthology Ghost Stories: Classic Tales of Horror and Suspense (co-edited with Leslie S. Klinger) was named a Publishers Weekly Pick of the Week.

Morton has written three non-fiction books on the history of Halloween: The Halloween Encyclopedia (2003, second edition published in 2011); A Hallowe'en Anthology: Literary and Historical Writings Over the Centuries (2008), which was nominated for the Black Quill Award and won the Bram Stoker Award for Best Non-Fiction; and Trick or Treat: A History of Halloween (2012), which won the Bram Stoker Award for Best Non-Fiction and the Halloween Book Festival Grand Prize Award.

She has also been interviewed for The History Channel’s documentary The Real Story of Halloween, the supplement The Lore and Legends of Halloween on the Blu Ray release of Trick 'r Treat, the How Halloween Has Changed episode of AHCTV’s America: Fact Vs. Fiction, and Coast to Coast AM with George Noory.

Her other non-fiction books include The Cinema of Tsui Hark (2001) and Savage Detours: The Life and Work of Ann Savage (2010, co-authored with Kent Adamson), and Ghosts: A Haunted History (2014).

Her non-fiction articles have appeared in such books as The Art of Horror (2015), The Oxford Companion to Sugar and Sweets (2015), Birthing Monsters: Frankenstein’s Cabinet of Curiosities and Cruelties (2018), and It’s Alive: Bringing Your Nightmares to Life (2018). She frequently interviews other authors for Nightmare Magazine and has provided feature articles for Shudder’s newsletter The Bite.

She co-authored (with Rocky Wood, art by Greg Chapman) the non-fiction graphic novel Witch Hunts: A Graphic History of the Burning Times (2012), which received the Bram Stoker Award for Best Graphic Novel.

From 2014 to 2019, Morton served as president of the Horror Writers Association.

A California native, she currently resides in Los Angeles, California.

Awards
2005 President's Richard Laymon Award from the Horror Writers Association
2006 President's Richard Laymon Award from the Horror Writers Association
Tested (2006 Bram Stoker Award for Best Short Fiction)
A Hallowe'en Anthology: Literary and Historical Writings Over the Centuries (2nd Annual Black Quill Award nominee)
A Hallowe'en Anthology: Literary and Historical Writings Over the Centuries (2008 Bram Stoker Award for Best Non-Fiction)
The Lucid Dreaming (2009 Bram Stoker Award for Best Long Fiction)
Midnight Walk (2009), Nominated for the Bram Stoker Award for Best Anthology
Midnight Walk (3rd Annual Black Quill Award winner for Best Dark Genre Anthology)
The Castle of Los Angeles (2010), Bram Stoker Award for Best First Novel
The Samhanach (2010), Nominated for the Bram Stoker Award for Best Long Fiction
Monsters of L.A. (2011), Nominated for the Bram Stoker Award for Best Fiction Collection
Trick or Treat: A History of Halloween (2012), Halloween Book Festival Grand Prize
Trick or Treat: A History of Halloween Bram Stoker Award for Best Non-Fiction
Witch Hunts: A Graphic History of the Burning Times (2012), Bram Stoker Award for Best Graphic Novel
Malediction (2013), Nominated for the Bram Stoker Award for Best Novel

Bibliography

Novels and collections
The Castle of Los Angeles, Gray Friar Press (2010)
The Monsters of L.A., Bad Moon Books (2011)
Malediction (2013)
Netherworld (2014)
Zombie Apocalypse!: Washington Deceased (2014)
Cemetery Dance Select: Lisa Morton (collection, 2015)
The Samhanach and Other Halloween Treats (collection, 2017)

Non-fiction
The Cinema of Tsui Hark, McFarland & Company 2001
The Halloween Encyclopedia, McFarland & Company 2003
A Hallowe'en Anthology: Literary and Historical Writings Over the Centuries, McFarland & Company 2008
Savage Detours: The Life and Work of Ann Savage, McFarland & Company 2010
Trick or Treat: A History of Halloween, Reaktion Books 2012
Ghosts: A Haunted History, Reaktion Books 2015 
Adventures in the Scream Trade (2016)

Novellas
The Free Way (1995)
The Lucid Dreaming, Bad Moon Books 2009
Diana and the Goong-si (2009) Midnight Walk
The Samhanach (2010)
Wild Girls (2012)
Hell Manor (2012)
Summer’s End (2013)
Smog (2013)
The Lower Animals (2013) (prequel to her novel Malediction)
By Insanity of Reason (with John R. Little) (2014)
The Devil's Birthday (2014)

Anthologies edited
Midnight Walk, Darkhouse Publishing 2009
Halloween Spirits: 11 Tales for the Darkest Night (2011) 
25: Celebrating a Quarter-Century of HWA (2012) 
Haunted Nights (co-edited with Ellen Datlow) (2017)
Ghost Stories: Classic Tales of Horror and Suspense (co-edited with Leslie S. Klinger) (2019)

Graphic novels
Witch Hunts: A Graphic History of the Burning Times (2012) (co-authored with Rocky Wood)

Short stories
Dates by original magazine or anthology publication.

Sane Reaction (1994) Dark Voices 6
Virus Verses (1995) Dream Forge May 1995 issue
Sensitive (1995) After Hours Winter 1995 issue
The Free Way (1995) chapbook
Poppi's Monster (1995) The Mammoth Book of Frankenstein
Love Eats (1996) Dark Terrors
Children of the Long Night (1997) The Mammoth Book of Dracula
Nikola, Moonstruck (1998) Horrors! 365 Scary Stories
Ghost Writer (1998) Horrors! 365 Scary Stories
The Fear of Eight Legs (1998) Horrors! 365 Scary Stories
The Proof in the Picture (1998) Horrors! 365 Scary Stories
A New Force of Nature (1999) White of the Moon
El Cazador (2000) After Shocks
Pound Rots in Fragrant Harbour (2003) The Museum of Horrors
The Call of Cthulhu: The Motion Picture (2003) Dead But Dreaming
Growing Man (2003) Framed: A Gallery of Dark Delicacies
The Death of Splatter (2004) Dark Terrors 6
Blind-Stamped (2005) Shelf Life: Fantastic Stories Celebrating Bookstores
Home Intrusion (2005) Hell Hath No Fury
Black Mill Cove (2005) Dark Delicacies: Original Tales of Terror and the Macabre
Sparks Fly Upward (2006) Mondo Zombie
Cold Duty (2006) At the Sign of the Snowman: Rolling Darkness Revue 2006
Tested (2006) Cemetery Dance issue #55
Forces of Evil, Starring Robert Fields (2007) Midnight Premiere (written with Richard Grove) 
The Maenads (2008) The Vault of Punk Horror
The Last Resort (2008) Dark Passions: Hot Blood XIII
Golden Eyes (2008) Horror Library Volume 3
Double Walker (2008) Unspeakable Horror: From the Shadows of the Closet
Unlucky (2008) Crimewave issue #10
Giallo (2009) Horror World March 2009
The Devil Came to Mamie's on Hallowe'en (2009) Cemetery Dance #60
The End (2009) Cinema Spec: Tales of Hollywood and Fantasy
Black Friday (2009) Horror Drive-In August 2009
Joe and Abel in the Field of Rest (2009) The Dead That Walk
They're Coming to Get You (2010) Zombie Apocalypse 
Silk City (2010) The Bleeding Edge
Blood for the American People (2012) Horror For Good: A Charitable Anthology (Volume 1)
The Rush (2012), Slices of Flesh 
When Harry Killed Sally (2012), Attic Toys 
Old Macdonald had an Animal Farm (2012), Blood Lite 3 
World Without End (2012), I Will Rise 
The Secret Engravings (2012), Danse Macabre
Day of the Dead (2012), Zombie Apocalypse!: Fightback
Pontianak (2012), Dark Discoveries, issue 21 (Fall 2012), issue includes interview with Morton
The Legend of Halloween Jack (2012), Cemetery Dance (ebook) 
The True Worth of Orthography (2013), Blood Rites
Angel Killer (2013), Nightscapes: Volume I
The Resurrection Policy (2013), After Death
Red Ink (2013), Shadow Masters
The Willowstown Women’s Cut and Dye Club (2013), Barbers & Beauties
Coming to Day (2013), The Haunted Mansion Project #2
Golden State (2013), Dark Fusion: Where Monsters Lurk
Feel the Noise (2013), Shivers VII
Hollywood Hannah (2013), Psycho-Mania
Zolamin and the Mad God (2013), Deepest, Darkest Eden
Alive-Oh (2013), The Horror Zine
The Rivet Gang (2014), Rocketeer: Jet Powered Adventures
She Devil-a-Go Go (2014), Hell Comes to Hollywood 2
Kevin Needs to Talk About Us (2014), Zombie Apocalypse!: Endgame 
Tamlane (2014), Out of Tune 
The Christmas Spirit (2014), Haunted Holidays
Bitter Shadows (2014), Madness on the Orient Express
Sexy Pirate Girl (2014), October Dreams 2
The Halloween Collector (2014), Halloween Forevermore (website)
Daddy’s Girl (2015), Shrieks and Shivers from The Horror Zine
The Ogre (2015), Shadows Over Main Street
A Girl’s Life (2015), Innsmouth Nightmares
Union Day (2015), Occupied Earth
The Maze (2015), Dark Hallows
Woolen Shirts and Gum Boots (2015), Blurring the Line
The New War (2015), Dark Screams Volume 4 
Finding Ulalume (2015), nEvermore 
Father of Ab (2015), Curse of the Blue Nile 
Down But Not Out at the End of the World (2016), Silent Screams
Cognition (2016), Madhouse 
Ant Farm (2016), Drive-In Creature Feature 
In the Garden (2016), The Beauty of Death 
Erasure (2016), Cemetery Riots 
St. Thomas of El Paso (2016), Tales From the Lake (Vol. 2)
One Night With the King of Lizards (2016), Scales and Tails 
Trigger Fate (2016), The Third Spectral Book of Horror 
The Fool on the Hill (2016), Dread State 
Silver Nitrate Blues (2016), Ghosts for Christmas 
The Enchanted Forest (2016), Dark Hallows II 
High Desert (2017), The Forsaken 
The Rich are Different (2017), Dark Screams (Vol. 6)
LaRue’s Dime Museum (2017), Behold!: Oddities, Curiosities, and Undefinable Wonders 
Eyes of the Beholders (2017), Adam’s Ladder 
La Hacienda de los Muertos (2017), Halloween Carnival 
The Wash (2017), The Beauty of Death 2: Death By Water 
The Perfect House (2017), Dead Ends
Black Jack Lonegan and the City of Dreams (2017), CEA Greatest Anthology Written
Hallowe’en in Blue and Gray (2017), The Horror Zine (October 2017)
The Dead Thing (2018), 100 Word Horrors 
Ofrenda (2018), Unspeakable Horror 2: Abominations of Desire
Summer of Sharks (2018), Scream and Scream Again
The Ultimate Halloween Party App (2018), The Mammoth Book of Halloween Stories
Job No. 34264 (2018), 18 Wheels of Science Fiction
The Dreams in the White House and Cool Air (2018), The Lovecraft Squad: Dreaming
The Joys of Christmas (2018), Collected Christmas Horror Shorts 2
Dr. Morbismo’s InsaniTERRORium Horror Show (2018), Pop the Clutch: Thrilling Tales of Rockabilly, Monsters, and Hot Rod Horror
The Gorgon (2019), Shivers VIII
Whatever Happened to Lorna Winters? (2019), Odd Partners
Holding Back (2019), A Secret Guide to Fighting Elder Gods
A Housekeeper’s Revenge (2019), Weird Tales

Poetry
Bodega Bay, 2004 (2011), A Sea of Alone: Poems for Alfred Hitchcock
The Straw Man (2016), HWA Poetry Showcase Vol. 3
Meeting the Elemental (2019), HWA Poetry Showcase Vol. 6

Miscellaneous
Acts of Darkness: Writing Horror for the Small Stage (2007), On Writing Horror Revised Edition
Lisa Morton’s Top Ten Asian Horror Movies and Five Scary Traditional Halloween Stories (2008), The Book of Lists: Horror
Smart Broads and Tough Guys: The Strange World of Vintage Paperbacks (2008), Clarkesworld July 2008
Why Writing Horror Screenplays is REALLY Scary (2009), Writers Workshop of Horror
Putting the Lie to the Inner Slasher (2011), Butcher Knives and Body Counts
The Walking Dead and The Dance of Death (2011), The Triumph of The Walking Dead
Sisters are Killin’ it for Themselves: Women in Horror (2012), Telling Tales of Terror
Introduction (2013), Deep Cuts: Mayhem, Menace, and Misery (anthology)
Introduction (2013), The Last Night of October (novella by Greg Chapman)
Introduction (2013), Little by Little (collection by John R. Little)
The Setting in Horror (2014), Now Write: Science Fiction, Fantasy, and Horror
Halloween on Television (2014), October Dreams 2
Foreword (2015), The Best of Horror Library Volumes 1-5 (anthology)
Halloween (2015), The Oxford Companion to Sugar and Sweets
Halloween Horrors (2015), The Art of Horror
The Skeptic’s Guide to Ghost Hunting (2016), Gamut Magazine #1
Introduction (2016), All That Withers (collection by John Palisano)
The Evil ‘80s (2017), The Art of Horror Movies
Introduction (2017), The Burden of Indigo (novel by Gene O'Neill)
Introduction (2017), StokerCon 2017 Souvenir Book
Drive-in Delinquents (2017), The Art of Pulp Horror
Introduction (2018), StokerCon 2018 Souvenir Anthology
The H-Word: Dementia and the Horror Writer (2018), Nightmare Magazine (May 2018)
Not a Princess Anymore: How the Casting of Winona Ryder in Stranger Things Speaks to the Essential Falsehood of 1980s Media Depictions of the American Working Class (2018), Uncovering Stranger Things: Essays on Eighties Nostalgia, Cynicism and Innocence in the Series
When It’s Their World: Writing for the Themed Anthology (2018), It’s Alive: Bringing Your Nightmares to Life
Fantamagoriana; or, The Ghost Stories That Galvanized Frankenstein (2018) Birthing Monsters: Frankenstein’s Cabinet of Curiosities and Cruelties 
Foreword (2019), Horror Literature from Gothic to Post-Modern: Critical Essays

Filmography
Meet the Hollowheads (1989)
Adventures in Dinosaur City (1992)
Toontown Kids (1994)
Dragon Flyz (1996)
Sky Dancers (television series) (1996)
Van-Pires (television series) (1997)
Blue Demon (2004)
Blood Angels (aka Thralls) (2004)
Glass Trap (2005)
Tornado Warning (2012)

See also
List of horror fiction authors

References

External links
Personal website

1958 births
American horror writers
American women screenwriters
Living people
Women horror writers
21st-century American women